Nieuwstadt is a city in the Dutch province of Limburg. It is a part of the municipality of Echt-Susteren, and lies about 5 km north of Sittard. Nieuwstadt received city rights in 1277.

History 
It was first mentioned in 1242 as "Novo Opido", and means "new (fortified) city", and received city rights in 1277. Nieuwstadt was a border city of the Duchy of Guelders and received city walls. In 1383, it was severe damaged and a more compact settlement developed. In 1573, the walls were demolished and Nieuwstadt started to stagnate.

The Catholic St John the Baptist Church has a nave from the 13th century. The choir was added in the 14th century is slight crooked. The church was restored in 1862 by Pierre Cuypers. The church was damaged during World War II and was repaired in 1946.

Millen Castle is located to the south-east of Nieuwstadt. There is still a ruin of the medieval castle which probably had its origins in the 13th century. In 1365, a ring wall with two towers were added. Around 1450, a second ring was added. The castle was demolished from 1650 onwards. In the late-17th century, an estate was built near the former castle.

Nieuwstadt was home to 830 people in 1840. It was a separate municipality until 1982, when it was merged into Echt-Susteren.

Gallery

Notable people
 Emeri Johannes van Donzel (1925–2017), historian
 Martijn van Helvert (born 1978), politician
 Demi Schuurs (born 1993), tennis player
 Perr Schuurs (born 1999), footballer

References

External links

Populated places in Limburg (Netherlands)
Former municipalities of Limburg (Netherlands)
Cities in the Netherlands
Echt-Susteren